Hirkan National Park — is a national park of Azerbaijan.

The area of Hirkan National Park is 99% covered by forests in a primarily mountainous region, and is strictly protected. It constitutes one of the largest contiguous forests in Azerbaijan, which is not interrupted by any settlement or pasture.

The Hirkan National Park protects the humid subtropical and humid temperate forests in the area of the  Lenkoran Lowland and the Talysh Mountains, sheltering many endemic plant and animal species.

The ecosystem of the Hirkan National Park, belongs to the Caspian Hyrcanian (Girkan) mixed forests ecoregion, an area of lush deciduous broadleaved lowland and montane forests (subtropical and temperate rainforests) that completely cover the Talysh Mountains and partially cover the Lankaran Lowland.

Climate
The Hirkan National Park normally has very high humidity and precipitation throughout the year, averaging from 1,400 mm to 1,600 mm per year in the lowlands to 1,800 mm per year in the mountains. The maximum annual precipitation is the highest precipitation in Azerbaijan.
The Hirkan National Park has a humid subtropical climate in the lowlands, an oceanic climate in the middle elevations and a humid continental climate on the mountain peaks.

The variety of elevations, the abundant rainfall, and the presence of old growth forests give the park an unusual richness of biota.

Flora and fauna

Flora

This area preserves many endemic plants species, relicts of the Tertiary period which were not affected by Pliocene and Pleistocene glaciations.

The Caspian Hyrcanian (Girkan) forests account for 150 endemic species of trees and bushes out of 435 species of trees and bushes. Some endemic tree species are, the Hyrcanian box tree (Buxus hyrcana), Caucasian pear (Pyrus communis subsp. caucasica), Lenkoran acacia (Albizia julibrissin), chestnut-leaved oak (Quercus castaneifolia), Caucasian oak (Quercus macranthera), Caucasian ash (Fraxinus angustifolia subsp. oxycarpa), European ash (Fraxinus excelsior), European hornbeam (Carpinus betulus), Oriental hornbeam (Carpinus orientalis), Oriental beech (Fagus orientalis), Caucasian persimmon (Diospyros lotus), Caspian locust tree (Gleditsia caspica), Caucasian alder (Alnus subcordata), black alder (Alnus glutinosa subsp. barbata), white poplar (Populus alba) Caucasian wingnut (Pterocarya fraxinifolia), Persian ironwood (Parrotia persica), Caucasian zelkova (Zelkova carpinifolia), butcher's broom (Ruscus aculeatus), velvet maple (Acer velutinum), Cappadocian maple (Acer cappadocicum), wych elm (Ulmus glabra), Caucasian lime tree (Tilia dasystyla subsp. caucasica), wild cherry (Prunus avium), wild service tree (Sorbus torminalis), sweet chestnut (Castanea sativa), among many others.

Shrub species occurring in the area include the poet's laurel (Danae racemosa), Hyrcanian holly (Ilex hyrcana), greenbrier (Smilax excelsa), common ivy (Hedera helix), etc.

Fauna

There are several endemic subspecies of birds, of which the Caspian tit (Poecile hyrcanus) subspecies of the titmouse; the Caucasus pheasant (Phasianus colchicus colchicus) subspecies of the common pheasant of the Talysh Mountains are common.

The Caspian tiger (Panthera tigris virgata) once roamed these mountains, but is now extinct. Other large mammals here are the Persian leopard (Panthera pardus saxicolor), lynx (Lynx lynx), brown bear (Ursus arctos), wild boar (Sus scrofa), wolf (Canis lupus), golden jackal (Canis aureus), jungle cat (Felis chaus), red fox (Vulpes vulpes), roe deer (Capreolus capreolus), badger (Meles meles), otter (Lutra lutra), etc.

The Persian leopard (Panthera pardus saxicolor) subspecies of the leopard, lives in the southern regions in Azerbaijan, primarily in the Talysh Mountains, Nagorno-Karabakh and Nakhichevan. Despite occasional sightings, it was not clear whether leopards had been extinct in Azerbaijan by the late 1990s until a species was caught on camera in March, 2007 in the Hirkan National Park.

Expansion and reforestation

The plain part of the Hirkan National Park ("Moscow Forest") lies within the Lankaran Lowland. The Moscow Forest is the only preserved part of the Caspian Hyrcanian mixed forests which covered most of the lowland, that was later cleared for agriculture.
However, there is a reforestation program of the lowland, on a designated non-forested lot which is the only non-cultivated land on the plain, in order to (partially because the Lankaran Lowland is far too valuable for its agricultural productivity for Azerbaijan, to be given up for reforestation) restore the ecology to its previous forested state. This lot will become the second forest in the lowland after the Moscow Forest and once it is reforested, it will become an additional part of the Hirkan National Park in the lowland.

UNESCO Status Application
For the purpose of including the Hirkan National Park and the Caspian Hyrcanian (Girkan) forests respectively into UNESCO's World Heritage Site list of cultural and natural heritage and Biosphere Reserves Programme, documents substantiated from the scientific point of view have been prepared and introduced to the UNESCO Secretariat.

Philately

See also
 Caspian Hyrcanian mixed forests
 Nature of Azerbaijan
 National Parks of Azerbaijan
 State Reserves of Azerbaijan
 State Game Reserves of Azerbaijan

References

External links

 Hirkan National Park Official Website - Ministry of Ecology and Natural Resources of Azerbaijan 

National parks of Azerbaijan
Forests of Azerbaijan
Alborz (mountain range)
Astara District
Lankaran District
Protected areas established in 2004
2004 establishments in Azerbaijan
World Heritage Tentative List
IUCN Category II